Diana Lee Inosanto is an American actress, director, stuntwoman, and martial artist. She also wrote and directed the film The Sensei (2008), as well as having written a children's book titled The Curious Mind of Sebastian in 2020.

Life and career
Inosanto was born in Torrance, California and was raised in  Carson, California and later, Harbor City, California, where she attended Narbonne High School. Her father is Dan Inosanto and she is married to fellow martial artist Ron Balicki.

Martial arts
Inosanto grew up surrounded by the martial arts world, studying many forms, including Jeet Kune Do and Eskrima, which she learned from her father, Dan Inosanto, a student of Jeet Kune Do founder Bruce Lee, who was also her godfather. She has appeared on the cover of numerous martial arts magazines, including Black Belt Magazine, Martial Arts, Inside Karate, Self Defense, and Inside Kung Fu. She was named Woman of the Year by Black Belt Magazine in 2009.

Film and television
Apart from doing stunt work and choreography in numerous films and television productions, Inosanto has also acted in a number of movies and series. Her directorial debut, The Sensei, was released in 2008.

In 2020, Inosanto appeared in one episode of the second season of Disney's The Mandalorian, playing the role of Magistrate Morgan Elsbeth.

Theatre
Inosanto is active in Southern California theatre as a member of the Asian American theatre group Lodestone Theatre Ensemble. In 2008 she worked with East West Players, serving as martial arts choreographer on the world premiere of Dan Kwong's play Be Like Water.

Writing
In 2020, Inosanto published her first book, the children's story The Curious Mind of Sebastian. The same year, she also contributed a foreword to the Fiaz Rafiq book Bruce Lee: The Life of a Legend.

Selected filmography

 Moonlighting (1986–87) (Actress - 7 episodes)
 Barb Wire (1996) (Stunts)
 Buffy the Vampire Slayer (1997–2002) (Stunts - 7 episodes)
 Spy Game (1997) (Stunts)
 Face/Off (1997) (Stunts)
 Team Knight Rider (1997) (Stunts)
 Red Corner (1997) (Stunts)
 The Roseanne Show (1997) (Stunts)
 Walker, Texas Ranger (1997–98) (Stunts - 4 episodes)
 Blade (1998) (Stunts, actress)
 The Patriot (1998) (Stunts)
 The Last Man on Planet Earth (1999) (Stunts)
 Wild Wild West (1999) (Stunts)
 Mystery Men (1999) (Stunts)
 MADtv (1999) (Actress - 1 episode)
 Life Streams (2000) (Actress, co-producer)
 Black Scorpion (2001) (Stunts)
 Fists of Cheese (2002) (Assistant stunt coordinator, associate producer)
 The Time Machine (2002) (Actress)
 On Sundays (2002) (Co-producer)
 A Ribbon of Dreams (2002) (Associate producer)
 Modern Warriors (2002) (Herself)
 Star Trek: Enterprise  (2002–05) (Stunts)
 Hulk (2003) (Actress)
 10-8: Officers on Duty (2003) (Stunts)
 Resident Evil: Apocalypse (2004) (Fight choreographer)
 The Vault (2005) (Actress)
 Rent (2005) (Actress)
 The Prodigy (2006) (Actress, associate producer)
 The Fast and the Furious: Tokyo Drift (2006) (Actress)
 The Sensei (2008) (Writer, director, producer, actress)
 Sinners and Saints (2010) (Co-producer, assistant stunt coordinator)
 I, Frankenstein (2014) (Martial arts trainer to Aaron Eckhart / Socratis Otto)
 Spy (2015) (Martial arts trainer to Melissa McCarthy)
 The Mandalorian (2020) (Actress - 1 episode)

References

External links
 
 

American Jeet Kune Do practitioners
American stunt performers
American film actresses
American actresses of Filipino descent
Actors from Torrance, California
Living people
20th-century American actresses
21st-century American actresses
Actresses of Filipino descent
People from Carson, California
People from Harbor City, Los Angeles
American television actresses
Year of birth missing (living people)